Pierre-Hugues Herbert and Nicolas Mahut won the men's doubles tennis title at the 2019 Australian Open, defeating Henri Kontinen and John Peers in the final, 6–4, 7–6(7–1). They are the first French players to achieve the Career Grand Slam as well as only the 8th Men's Doubles pair to achieve this feat. 

Oliver Marach and Mate Pavić were the defending champions, but lost to Máximo González and Nicolás Jarry in the second round.

Seeds

Draw

Finals

Top half

Section 1

Section 2

Bottom half

Section 3

Section 4

References

External links
Draw
 2019 Australian Open – Men's draws and results at the International Tennis Federation

Men's Doubles
Australian Open (tennis) by year – Men's doubles